Camilla Pistorello (born 1 July 1987) is an Italian actress and former ice dancer. She competed twice at the World Junior Championships, once each with Luca Lanotte and Matteo Zanni.

Programs

With Zanni

With Lanotte

With Caspani

Competitive highlights

With Zanni

With Lanotte

With Caspani

References

External links 
 
 
 

Italian female ice dancers
1987 births
Living people
Figure skaters from Milan
20th-century Italian women
21st-century Italian women